Tourism Malaysia or Malaysia Tourism Promotion Board (MTPB) is an agency under the Ministry of Tourism, Malaysia.

Tourism Malaysia, formerly known as the "Tourist Development Corporation of Malaysia (TDC)", was established on 10 August 1972. It was then under the former Ministry of Trade and Industry.

History 
The Tourist Development Corporation of Malaysia (TDC) was established on 10 August 1972 as an agency under the former Ministry of Trade and Industry by an Act of Parliament.
With the inception of the Ministry of Culture, Arts and Tourism on 20 May 1987, TDC was moved to this new ministry; and became the Malaysia Tourism Promotion Board (MTPB) through the Malaysia Tourism Promotion Board Act 1992. Popularly known as Tourism Malaysia, its full focus is on promoting Malaysia domestically and internationally.
Tourism Malaysia now has 34 overseas and 11 marketing representative offices.

Promotional efforts 
In September 2006, Tourism Malaysia signed a £2 million deal with Manchester United in an effort to promote Visit Malaysia Year 2007. Prior to that, Tourism Malaysia had a deal with Chelsea F.C. The success of the Visit Malaysia Year 2007, a celebration of Malaysia's diverse cultures, beautiful holiday locations and unique attractions has helped propel the country to the forefront in tourism. Tourism Malaysia sponsored the Carlton Football Club in the Australian Football League in 2009.

In 2010, Tourism Malaysia announced that it would be making greater efforts to attract New Zealanders. "Initiatives include a greater focus on ecotourism, major cultural events and activities for young urban professionals. Family-friendly destinations, wellness activities, value for money and a safe, clean environment are some the key drivers of this market," said Ng.

The government has started a campaign called "1Malaysia Green, 1Malaysia Clean" in order to let tour operators and travelers understand the need to protect nature areas while promoting eco-tourism.

In 2016, Tourism Malaysia stated 'Besides mass tourists, we are also trying to focus on niche tourism products such as sports including motoring and others, golfing, bird watching, medical and wellness as well as shopping.' Shopping brings in the highest revenue share at 30 per cent of total tourism revenue in 2015.

Leadership
 Dato' Seri Ramlan Ibrahim (Current Chairman of Tourism Malaysia)
 Datuk Ahmad Shah Hussein Tambakau 
 Dato' Siew Ka Wei
 Tan Sri Ng Yen Yen
 Wee Choo Keong

References

External links
Tourism Malaysia
Ministry of Tourism Malaysia
 السياحة في ماليزيا Malaysia Tourism

Federal ministries, departments and agencies of Malaysia
Tourism in Malaysia
Tourism agencies
1992 establishments in Malaysia
Government agencies established in 1992
Ministry of Tourism, Arts and Culture (Malaysia)